Souk al-Tawileh is a street located in the heart of downtown Beirut, Lebanon.

Overview
Dating back to the Phoenico-Persian period, this street flourished as a prosperous commercial venue until the outbreak of the Civil War in 1975.

Construction
Souk al-Tawileh (‘al-Tawileh’ meaning long in Arabic) is the central north-south street of the Souks district; it once led all the way to the harbor. 1994 excavations in Beirut revealed that the street’s origins dated back to the Phoenico-Persian period. In 1874, the Ottoman urbanization plan of Beirut turned Souk al-Tawileh into a modern commercial street. It flourished until 1975 as a prosperous shopping venue.

History
Souk al-Tawileh (‘al-Tawileh’ meaning long in Arabic) is the central north-south street of Beirut Souks; it once led all the way to the harbor. During the post-war reconstruction of Beirut’s central district that began in 1994, excavations through successive layers revealed that the street’s origins dated back to the Phoenico-Persian period. Souk al-Tawileh thrived in Romano-Byzantine times; it lost its standing after the 551 Beirut earthquake, remaining a simple earth path for a long time. In 1874, the Ottoman urbanization plan of Beirut turned Souk al-Tawileh into a modern commercial street. It flourished until 1975 as a prosperous shopping venue. Its shops often bore French names, and sold clothing, perfumes and other luxury articles. A shop owner whose family had a store in Souk al-Tawileh remembers: "This large store was one of the oldest and most attractive stores of the city center. It had a surface area of 800 square meters. People came from all over Lebanon and Syria to admire it and buy silver, crystal and porcelain articles, fabrics, hats, gloves, toys…" Another Beiruti recalls a store located at the end of Souk al-Tawileh, on the corner of Souk al-Franj, that offered rare and exotic fruits as well as French cheeses arranged in ‘wonderful displays.

Timeline
Phoenico-Persian Period: Origin of Souk al-Tawileh street.

551 A.D: Earthquake destroyed street and turned it into a simple earth path.
  
1874: Ottoman urbanization plan of Beirut turned Souk al-Tawileh into a modern commercial street.

1975: Souk thrived as a prosperous shopping venue until outbreak of the Civil War.

1994: beginning of the post war reconstruction of Beirut’s central district restituted the street's importance.

References 
 
 
The Souks in their Memory" (1994) in : The Reconstruction of the Souks of Beirut. An International Ideas Competition, Solidere, Beirut.}

Shopping districts and streets in Lebanon
Souqs
Tourist attractions in Lebanon